Coleophora dianthivora is a moth of the family Coleophoridae. It is found in France, Spain and Italy. Full-grown larvae can be found in May.

References

dianthivora
Moths described in 1901
Moths of Europe